Ben Nathan Gleiberman (born June 18, 1978), known professionally as Ben Gleib, is an American actor, comedian, satirist, and writer.

Early life and education
Gleib was born to Nate and Ziva Gleiberman in Los Angeles, California, on June 18, 1978. He has one brother, Ron Gleiberman, who is younger.

Gleib attended the University of California, San Diego, where he studied communications and theater. His honors thesis work included producing a four-year campus TV talk show, The Gleib Show, the finale of which included Gleib's delivery to UC San Diego's Price Center Plaza by marines in a military tank, followed by an interview with Carmen Electra.

Career
In 2006, Gleib sold a television pilot, The Gleib Show, to Fox. The pilot was produced by Saturday Night Live creator Lorne Michaels, Broadway Video, and NBC/Universal. It was based on a TV show that Gleib directed, wrote, and starred in for three seasons on the National Lampoon College Network from 2003 to 2005 that aired to college campuses across the country; it was consistently the network's number one show. It was co-written and produced by Scot Richardson. The series was based on a show of the same title that Gleib had performed for four years while he attended college at the University of California, San Diego.

In 2007, Gleib starred in the NBC series The Real Wedding Crashers, a primetime comedy. The show also aired on Bravo and the Style Network.

Gleib was billed as one of "the six comedians who could be comedy's next big things" and part of "a bumper crop of brilliant new-alt comics" by Esquire. He was also named one of the "funniest comedians working today" by TBS. In 2008, Gleib was featured on the NBC competition show Last Comic Standing, and the following year he performed stand-up on NBC's Last Call with Carson Daly. He is known for covering a wide range of topics in his act as well as his improvisational skills, often making up large sections of his performance based on interactions with the crowd.

Gleib was a regular guest on the E! late night talk show Chelsea Lately for seven years until the show ended in 2014. He has been a frequent guest on KPCC (Southern California's NPR affiliate) on the Patt Morrison Program, bringing his comedic spin to political issues. He also reported for KPCC live from the 2008 Republican National Convention in St. Paul, Minnesota.

Gleib appears in a supporting role in the feature film Bar Starz (2008), which had a limited theatrical release. The film also featured Charlie Murphy, Daniel Franceze, Derek Waters, Jon Bernthal, and Nikki Griffin. Gleib is also the voice of Marshall the Sloth in Ice Age: Continental Drift (2012), one of the stars of Kevin Smith's Jay & Silent Bob's Super Groovy Cartoon Movie! (2013), and the voice of Dali in The Book of Life (2014). His voices have also appeared in Phineas and Ferb and the YouTube series The Melvin Bros.

In addition, Gleib has performed on The Late Late Show on CBS, at both the Vancouver Comedy Festival and Laughing Matters Festival in the Netherlands, hosted several podcasts for Current TV, and wrote for the "Radio Music Awards" for ABC in 2002.

Since November 2011, Gleib has hosted the podcast Last Week on Earth with Ben Gleib, distributed through Kevin Smith's SModcast Podcast Network.

Beginning in August 2014, Gleib hosted four seasons of the television game show Idiotest on the Game Show Network.

Gleib was guest co-anchor for a week for ABC News digital, from ABC News world headquarters in New York, and provided election night coverage for them in 2016. He has been a frequent on-air contributor on CNN, The Young Turks, and NPR, winning a Golden Mic Award for his work on Southern California NPR's Patt Morrison's Comedy Congress. In 2017, he was one of the hosts of the social impact news show ASPIREist on CNN's Headline News.

His hour-long stand-up special Ben Gleib: Neurotic Gangster debuted on Showtime in 2016 and has been available on Amazon Prime.

In October 2021, Charlie Kirk invited Gleib on his show for a debate billed as "A Long-Form Debate with a Deranged Pro-Abortion Activist". Gleib showed him a photograph of a fetus and asked him if it was a human being, to which Kirk replied, "without a doubt", before Gleib revealed that it was actually that of a dolphin.

On December 2, 2022, Gleib, who is of Jewish heritage, made an appearance on The Young Turks to criticize Kanye West for an interview he had done with InfoWars, wherein West praised Adolf Hitler and the Nazis and denied the Holocaust.

2020 United States presidential campaign
On May 13, 2019, Gleib announced his candidacy for President of the United States on Twitter. Shortly thereafter, Cenk Uygur of The Young Turks interviewed Gleib. He was also interviewed by Larry King on Politicking with Larry King, and by Hannah Jewell of The Washington Post.

On August 21, 2019, at the annual AFL-CIO convention at Prairie Meadows Hotel in Altoona, Gleib was the final speaker out of all 2020 Democratic candidates who spoke. However, Gleib struggled to finance his campaign, raising less than $70,000 through all of 2019. Accordingly, on December 30, 2019, Gleib ended his campaign.

Nowhere Comedy Club
In response to the COVID-19 pandemic that left many comedians out of work, Gleib started the Nowhere Comedy Club with fellow comedian Steve Hofstetter. Unlike other virtual venues, Nowhere encouraged audiences to keep their video and audio active during Zoom sessions so that performers could see and hear the audience's laughter.

Within a few months, Nowhere had sold over 10,000 tickets to livestreamed comedy events. Comedians including Jackie Fabulous, Sean Patton, Jay Jurden, Josh Johnson, Nikki Glaser, and Christian Finnegan all performed at Nowhere during the first year of operation. Gleib has indicated his intention to continue exploring virtual opportunities for Nowhere even as lockdowns and other COVID-19 restrictions are lifted in the United States and other countries.

References

1978 births
Living people
21st-century American comedians
American game show hosts
American male actors
American male comedians
American podcasters
Candidates in the 2020 United States presidential election
Comedians from California
Jewish American comedians
People from Los Angeles
The Young Turks people